God Loves You When You're Dancing is the debut extended play by Australian singer-songwriter Vance Joy. It was released in Australia on 22 March 2013 via Liberation Music.

The EP was nominated for two awards at the ARIA Music Awards of 2013; ARIA Award for Breakthrough Artist - Release, but lost to Flume by Flume and ARIA Award for Best Pop Release, but lost to Armageddon by Guy Sebastian.

The EP contains the single, "Riptide", which in May 2015 became the longest-charting song in ARIA Chart history, having remained in the top 100 for 107 weeks and counting. It surpassed previous record holder, Poker Face by Lady Gaga's 106 week record. In January 2016, the week count was at 120.

In March 2019, to celebrate the EP's 6 year anniversary, Joy announced a limited edition 10" of the EP on vinyl for release on 26 April. This was the first time the EP had ever been released on Vinyl and was limited to 1,000 units.  As from September of that year, it was accredited by Australian Recording Industry Association (ARIA) with 9× platinum certificates, for shipment of 630,000 units. It had peaked at No. 1 on the ARIA Australian Artists Singles Chart and was still on that chart in that month for 208 weeks; it also peaked at No. 9 on the related ARIA Streaming Singles Chart and was still on that chart for 145 weeks.

Singles 
Vance Joy's first single was "From Afar" released on 21 January 2013 and was listed as the last song in the EP. "Riptide" was Vance Joy's second single, released on 21 May 2013. In an interview with Digital Journal Vance Joy admitted to writing its first two lines in 2008 and coming back to it later in 2012. Both songs where also included on his full length album "Dream Your Life Away".

Critical reception

Grace Goodfellow of The Ripe TV gave the extended play a positive review, praising each song and concluding; "Vance Joy isn’t just a musician. He is an artist and this EP is his masterpiece. ‘’God Loves You When You’re Dancing’’ is a beautiful piece of art – it really, truly is."
Daniel Falconer of Female First UK also praised each track and gave the  EP 5 out of 5 saying "Vance Joy is without a doubt one of the most exciting singer-songwriters to emerge from the scores we see on a regular basis, and any fan of music would be a fool not to keep an eye firmly on him." Jon Sidwell of Music Liberation claimed the EP should "please many" and that his voice contained "a striking combination of fragility and confidence".

Tour

On February 25, 2013, Joy announced the God Loves You When You're Dancing Tour, his first concert series as a solo artist. In April, due to the demand Vance decided to add two more dates to his tour. Before that, Joy was the opening act, between January and February, for the Icelandic band Of Monsters and Men's tour of the Australia and the Australian singer Julia Stone on her Heavenly Sounds Tour. In March, Vance performed at several major music festivals, including Festival Hall in Melbourne, Secret Garden Festival ins Sydney, SXSW Festival in Austin and The Hills Are Alive Festival in Melbourne. The Joy's tour began on April 8, 2013 in Sydney, Australia at The Vanguard and finished on April 30, 2013 in Melbourne.

Set list

"Emmylou"
"From Afar"
"Red Eye"
"Snaggletooth"
"Play with Fire"
"Riptide"

Shows

Track listing

Notes
  signifies a co-producer
  signifies an executive producer

Charts

Certifications

Release history

See also
 List of best-selling singles in Australia

References

2013 debut EPs
Vance Joy albums
Indie pop EPs
EPs by Australian artists